Barbara Schulz is a French actress who won the Prix Suzanne Bianchetti in 2001. She was nominated for the César Award for Most Promising Actress for the 1999 film La Dilettante.

For her performances on the stage, Schulz has been nominated several times for the Molière Award, winning in 2001 in the category Best Female Newcomer (Molière de la révélation théâtrale) for the play Joyeuses Pâques.

In 2011, she moved from France to New York City, where she was cast in an episode of the short-lived TV series Pan Am as an Italian woman spying for the USSR, in a recurring role.

Filmography
 1999 : The Dilettante
 2001 : Un aller simple
 2004 : Colette, une femme libre, directed by Nadine Trintignant (TV Mini-Series)
 2004 : Textiles
 2009 : Bank Error in Your Favour
 2015 : Le mystère du lac, TV Mini-Series
 2016 : Hidden Kisses

Television
 2013 : The Blacklist, episode "The Courier"

References

External links

Official MySpace page

1972 births
Living people
People from Talence
French stage actresses
French film actresses
French television actresses
Knights of the Ordre national du Mérite